NGC 448 is a lenticular galaxy of type S0^- (edge-on) located approximately  away in the constellation Cetus. It was discovered on September 2, 1886 by Lewis Swift. It was described by Dreyer as "pretty bright, very small, [and] a little extended."

References

External links
 

0448
18860902
Cetus (constellation)
Lenticular galaxies
004524